Zero or Zéro is the surname, given name or pseudonym of:

People
 Zero Mostel, stage name of American actor Samuel Joel Mostel (1915–1977)
 João Zero (cartoonist) (born 1950), Brazilian illustrator
 Gonzalo Barrios (eSports player) (born 1995), professional Super Smash Bros. for Wii U player known by his alias ZeRo
 Karl Zéro, stage name of French filmmaker Marc Tellenne (born 1961)
 Renato Zero, stage name of Italian singer/songwriter Renato Fiacchini (born 1950)
 Zero, stage name of Japanese bass player of the former band D'espairsRay
 Zero (wrestler) or Lady Zero, briefly a ring name of Japanese professional wrestler Chigusa Nagayo (born 1964)

Fictional characters
 Count Zero (Count Zero, Mona Lisa Overdrive) titular character in 2nd book of William Gibson’s Sprawl trilogy
Mr. Zero or Mr. Freeze, a DC comic book supervillain
 Zero (Battle Arena Toshinden), in the Battle Arena Toshinden universe
 Zero (Beetle Bailey), in the Beetle Bailey universe
 Zero (Code Geass) or Lelouch Lamperouge, the main character in the Code Geass universe
 Zero (Digimon) or Zeromaru, in Digimon media
 Zero (Dragon Ball) or Son Goku, the main character in Dragon Ball media
 Zero (Drakengard), in Drakengard 3
 Zero (Grand Theft Auto), in the Grand Theft Auto universe
 Zero (Hit the Floor character), character from the basketball soap opera Hit the Floor
 Zero (Holes) or Hector Zeroni, in the Holes universe
 Zero (The King of Fighters), in The King of Fighters media
 Zero (Kirby), in Kirby media
 Zero (Marvel Comics), several characters in the Marvel Universe
 Zero (Mega Man), in Mega Man media
 Zero (The Nightmare Before Christmas), a ghost dog owned by Jack Skellington, the main character in The Nightmare Before Christmas media
 Zero (O-Parts Hunter), in the O-Parts Hunter universe
 ZERO (Sonic the Hedgehog) or E-100 Alpha, a robot in Sonic the Hedgehog media
 Zero (Tenchi Muyo!), in the Tenchi Muyo! universe
 Zero, an assassin in the 2012 2K / Gearbox game Borderlands 2
 Zero Kiryu, in Vampire Knight media
 Darryl Zero (Zero Effect), in the Zero Effect universe
 Kenshiro "Zero" Cochrane, a Marvel comic book superhero
 Zero (Cosmo Warrior Zero), in the Cosmo Warrior Zero universe
 Major Zero, in the Metal Gear Solid universe
 Sergeant Major Zero, in the Terrahawks universe
 Captain Zero, in the TUGS universe
 Zero, an assassin in the John Wick universe
 Zero, the main character in the Katana Zero universe
 Zero (Pokémon), in the Pokémon universe
 Zero Moustafa, in the 2014 film The Grand Budapest Hotel
 Agent Zero, a Marvel Comics character
 Miranda Zero, a major recurring character in the Global Frequency comic book series
 Ultraman Zero, an Ultra Warrior who is the son of Ultra Seven
 Numbuh 0, Monty Uno (father of Numbuh 1, Nigel Uno) when he was a member of the Kids Next Door

See also
 Louise the Zero, a character in Zero no Tsukaima media

Zero no one